Norton Chase (September 3, 1861, Albany, New York – 1922) was an American lawyer and politician from the state of New York.

Life and career
Norton Chase was the son of Nelson H. Chase. He graduated from The Albany Academy in 1878 and attended Yale College. He graduated from Albany Law School in 1882 and practiced law in Albany.

Chase was Assistant Corporation Counsel of the City of Albany for two years. A Democrat, he served in the New York State Assembly (Albany Co., 3rd D.) in 1886. On June 22, 1887, he married Mabel Louise James.

Chase ran for New York State Senate in 1887, but was defeated by Republican Henry Russell by an eight-vote margin. He ran again in 1889 and prevailed. Chase was a member of the New York State Senate (17th D.) in 1890 and 1891.

In the New York state election, 1895, Chase ran on the Democratic ticket for New York Attorney General, but was defeated by the incumbent Republican Theodore E. Hancock.

Chase died in 1922 and was buried at the Albany Rural Cemetery in Menands, New York.

References

External links
 The New York Red Book compiled by Edgar L. Murlin (published by James B. Lyon, Albany NY, 1897; pg. 403 and 504)

1861 births
1922 deaths
Democratic Party New York (state) state senators
Politicians from Albany, New York
Yale College alumni
Albany Law School alumni
Burials at Albany Rural Cemetery
Lawyers from Albany, New York
The Albany Academy alumni
19th-century American lawyers